Gesine Lötzsch (born 7 August 1961) is a German politician of the left-wing party Die Linke ("The Left"). In 2010, with Klaus Ernst, she was elected president of the party.

Biography 
Born at Berlin-Lichtenberg in what then was East Germany, Lötzsch joined the Socialist Unity Party of Germany in 1984 and continued a member of its successor parties: the SED-PDS (1989–1990), the PDS, (1990–2005), Die Linkspartei.PDS (2005–2007), and from 2007, Die Linke. In 2002, as a candidate of the Party of Democratic Socialism, Lötzsch was elected to the German parliament (the Bundestag) for the constituency Berlin-Lichtenberg, which she continues to represent today. For her first term, she and Petra Pau were the only PDS deputies in the chamber as the party failed to surpass the 5% electoral threshold. In the 2021 German federal elections her winning her constituency again proved pivotal as her party again failed to surpass the electoral threshold but gained representation proportional to its vote share due to having won three constituencies (in addition to hers Berlin-Treptow-Köpenick won by Gregor Gysi and Leipzig II won by Sören Pellmann).

Lötzsch has been criticized for suggesting that former employees of the Stasi, the secret police of the former East German state, should be allowed to serve in parliaments and governments. The leader of the Alliance '90/The Greens, Claudia Roth, claimed that Gesine Lötzsch wants to "sweep the past under the carpet". Lötzsch's local party group in Berlin-Lichtenberg has invited former Stasi employees and informers to speak on several occasions with her support: for instance, Erich Mielke's immediate deputy, Werner Grossmann, was invited as a speaker.

Gesine Lötzsch was married to Ronald Lötzsch (1931–2018), who in 2010 was revealed to have been an informer for the Stasi.

References

External links 

 Official Website of Gesine Lötzsch
 Biography from German Bundestag
 Biography by Die Linke party

1961 births
Living people
Female members of the Bundestag
Members of the Bundestag for Berlin
21st-century German women politicians
Members of the Bundestag 2021–2025
Members of the Bundestag 2017–2021
Members of the Bundestag 2013–2017
Members of the Bundestag 2009–2013
Members of the Bundestag 2005–2009
Members of the Bundestag 2002–2005
Members of the Bundestag for The Left
People from Lichtenberg